The Lonely Mountain is a 1984 board game published by Iron Crown Enterprises.

Gameplay
The Lonely Mountain is a game in which players lead groups of dwarves, elves, men, orcs, or freebooters into the catacombs of the Lonely Mountain to steal as much of Smaug's treasure as they can.

Reception
Rick Swan reviewed The Lonely Mountain in The Space Gamer No. 75. Swan commented that "I'll give Lonely Mountain a thumbs up if I.C.E. will promise two things: (1) no more hack-and-slash dungeon boardgames, and (2) if you're going to promote your stuff as Tolkien products, give us a little more Tolkien next time. That said, nice job."

Andy Blakeman reviewed The Lonely Mountain for Imagine magazine, and stated that "Iron Crown Enterprises have come up with a good idea, combining a race against time with a wargame, but it is unlikely that I would choose to spend [this much] on this game."

The Lonely Mountain was awarded the Charles S. Roberts Award for "Best Fantasy Boardgame of 1984".

References

Board games introduced in 1984
Iron Crown Enterprises games